Bais may refer to:

 Bais (wine), a traditional alcoholic drink made from honey from the Mandaya and Manobo people of the Philippines
 Bais, Negros Oriental, a city in the Philippines
 Bais, Ille-et-Vilaine, a commune of the Ille-et-Vilaine département, in France
 Bais, Mayenne, a commune of the Mayenne département, in France
 Bais Rajput, a Rajput clan of India
 Anjhula Mya Bais, psychologist, feminist, former model and life coach

See also
 Bai (disambiguation)